Melodion may refer to:
Melodion (friction instrument), a type of 19th century friction key instrument
Melodion, a brand of melodica produced by Suzuki

See also
 Melodeon (disambiguation)